The 2002 Samsung/RadioShack 500 was the seventh stock car race of the 2002 NASCAR Winston Cup Series and the sixth iteration of the event. The race originally was scheduled to be held on Sunday, April 7, 2002, but was delayed to Monday, April 8, 2002, due to rain. The race was held in Fort Worth, Texas at Texas Motor Speedway, a 1.5 miles (2.4 km) permanent tri-oval shaped racetrack. The race took the scheduled 334 laps to complete. At race's end, Matt Kenseth, driving for Roush Racing, would come from the back to win his third career NASCAR Winston Cup Series win and his first of the season. To fill out the podium, Jeff Gordon of Hendrick Motorsports and Mark Martin of Roush Racing would finish second and third, respectively.

Background 

Texas Motor Speedway is a speedway located in the northernmost portion of the U.S. city of Fort Worth, Texas – the portion located in Denton County, Texas. The track measures 1.5 miles (2.4 km) around and is banked 24 degrees in the turns, and is of the oval design, where the front straightaway juts outward slightly. The track layout is similar to Atlanta Motor Speedway and Charlotte Motor Speedway (formerly Lowe's Motor Speedway). The track is owned by Speedway Motorsports, Inc., the same company that owns Atlanta and Charlotte Motor Speedway, as well as the short-track Bristol Motor Speedway.

Entry list 

 (R) denotes rookie driver.

(R) denotes rookie driver.Practice 
Originally, three practice sessions were scheduled to be held, with one session on Friday, and two on Saturday. However, rain on Saturday would cancel both Saturday sessions.

The only practice session was held on Friday, April 5, at 11:20 AM CST.

Qualifying 
Qualifying was held on Friday, April 5, at 3:05 PM CST. Each driver would have two laps to set a fastest time; the fastest of the two would count as their official qualifying lap. Positions 1-36 would be decided on time, while positions 37-43 would be based on provisionals. Six spots are awarded by the use of provisionals based on owner's points. The seventh is awarded to a past champion who has not otherwise qualified for the race. If no past champ needs the provisional, the next team in the owner points will be awarded a provisional.

Ron Hornaday Jr. was the only driver to fail to qualify.

Full qualifying results

Race results

References 

2002 NASCAR Winston Cup Series
NASCAR races at Texas Motor Speedway
April 2002 sports events in the United States
2002 in sports in Texas